The Petah Tikva-Kiryat Aryeh railway station is a suburban passenger railway station in Israel, operated by Israel Railways. It is located in the northern Kiryat Aryeh business area and industrial zone of Petah Tikva, and mainly serves commuters from other towns who work in Petah Tikva. The station is adjacent to HaMoshava Stadium. It consists of a passenger hall and two side platforms serving two tracks on the Yarkon Railway. Space exists to allow converting the far side platform to an island platform, allowing the station to serve a total of three tracks in the future.

As of 2020, the Tel Aviv Red Line light rail's maintenance depot is being constructed across the tracks from the Kiryat Aryeh railway station, as is a light rail station and a pedestrian tunnel which will allow passengers to transfer between the heavy rail and light rail stations.

In October 2019 the station was the setting of a viral video. The video showcased a feral cat sitting on the gates while passengers streamed past it. The two-minute video went viral and accumulated millions of views and TV coverage around the world, a few days later the mayor of Petah Tikva came to pay tribute to the cat and was also caught on camera and became a part of the ongoing story

Train service

Ridership

References

Railway stations in Central District (Israel)
Railway stations opened in 2008
2008 establishments in Israel
Buildings and structures in Petah Tikva